Year 1478 (MCDLXXVIII) was a common year starting on Thursday (link will display the full calendar) of the Julian calendar.

Events 
 January–December 
 January 14 – Novgorod surrenders to Ivan III, Grand Prince of Moscow.
 January 15 – Richard of Shrewsbury, Duke of York is married to Anne de Mowbray, 8th Countess of Norfolk.
 February 18 – George Plantagenet, 1st Duke of Clarence, convicted of treason against his older brother Edward IV of England, is privately executed in the Tower of London.
 April 26 – The Pazzi Family attacks Lorenzo de' Medici, and kills his brother Giuliano, during High Mass in Florence Cathedral.
 May 14 – The Siege of Shkodra, Albania begins.
 November – Eskender succeeds his father Baeda Maryam, as Emperor of Ethiopia, at the age of six.
 November 1 – The Spanish Inquisition begins.
 December 28 – Battle of Giornico: Swiss troops defeat the Milanese.

 Date unknown 
 Grand Duchy of Moscow devolved from the Golden Horde.
 Lorenzo de' Medici becomes sole ruler of Florence.
 The Demak Sultanate gains independence from Majapahit, after a civil war.
 The Fourth Siege of Krujë, Albania by the Ottoman Empire, concludes and results in the town's capture, after the failure of three prior sieges.
 Vladislav II of Bohemia makes peace with Hungary.
 Possibly the first reference to cricket, in "criquet", as discovered in France by Rowland Bowen in the 20th century.  It has been dismissed by some (most notably John Major) and presaged with Edward II's "Creag" (1300) by others.
  Mondino de Liuzzi's Anathomia corporis humani, the first complete published anatomical text, is first printed (in Padua).

Births 
 February 3 – Edward Stafford, 3rd Duke of Buckingham (d. 1521)
 February 7 – Thomas More, English statesman and humanist (d. 1535)
 May 26 – Pope Clement VII (d. 1534)
 June 30 – John, Prince of Asturias, Son of Ferdinand II of Aragon and Isabella I of Castile (d. 1497)
 July 2 – Louis V, Elector Palatine (1508–1544) (d. 1544)
 July 8 – Gian Giorgio Trissino (d. 1550)
 July 13 – Giulio d'Este, illegitimate son of Italian noble (d. 1561)
 July 15 – Barbara Jagiellon, Duchess consort of Saxony and Margravine consort of Meissen (1500–1534) (d. 1534)
 July 22 – King Philip I of Castile (d. 1506)
 August – Gonzalo Fernández de Oviedo y Valdés, Spanish historian (d. 1557)
 December 6 – Baldassare Castiglione, Italian courtier and writer (d. 1529)
 date unknown
 Jacques Dubois, French anatomist (d. 1555)
 Giovanna d'Aragona, Duchess of Amalfi, Italian regent (d. 1510)
 Girolamo Fracastoro, Italian physician (d. 1553)
 Visconte Maggiolo, Italian navigator and cartographer (d. 1530)
 Katharina von Zimmern, Swiss sovereign abbess (d. 1547)
 probable 
 Thomas Ashwell, English composer
 Madeleine Lartessuti, French shipper and banker (d. 1543)

Deaths 
 February 1 – Cristoforo della Rovere, Italian Catholic cardinal (b. 1434)
 February 18 – George Plantagenet, 1st Duke of Clarence, brother of Edward IV of England and Richard III of England (executed) (b. 1449)
 April 26 – Giuliano de' Medici, son of Piero di Cosimo de' Medici (assassinated) (b. 1453)
 June 12 – Ludovico III Gonzaga, Marquis of Mantua (b. 1412)
 August 23 – Yolande of Valois, Duchess consort of Savoy (b. 1434)
 August 28 – Donato Acciaioli, Italian scholar (b. 1428)
 November 8 – Emperor Baeda Maryam I of Ethiopia (b. 1448)
 date unknown – Aliodea Morosini, Venetian dogaressa

References